A Reality Tour is a live album by David Bowie that was released on 25 January 2010. The album features 22 and 23 November 2003 performances in Dublin during his concert tour A Reality Tour. This is an audio version of the concert video of the same name, except that it adds three bonus tracks. The digital download on iTunes adds two more bonus tracks.

Track listing
All songs written by David Bowie except where noted.

Personnel
David Bowie – vocals, guitars, Stylophone, harmonica
Earl Slick – guitar
Gerry Leonard – guitar, backing vocals
Gail Ann Dorsey – bass guitar, backing vocals, lead vocals on "Under Pressure"
Sterling Campbell – drums
Mike Garson – keyboards, piano
Catherine Russell – keyboards, percussion, acoustic guitar, backing vocals

Charts

Certifications

References

David Bowie live albums
2010 live albums
Columbia Records live albums
Legacy Recordings live albums